Andrew Grant Dalton (born 16 November 1951) is a former New Zealand rugby union player. He captained the national team, the All Blacks, 17 times in tests. He is a second-generation All Black; his father Ray Dalton played in two All Blacks tests in the late 1940s.

Early years 
Although born in Dunedin, he was schooled at Selwyn College in Auckland (not to be confused with Selwyn College at the University of Otago), playing for the school's first team in 1968 and 1969 as a prop. He then returned to the South Island, enrolling at Lincoln College (then a part of the University of Canterbury) to study for a Bachelor of Agricultural Science. While there, he converted to hooker, and represented Canterbury at under-20 and senior reserve level.

After graduating, he returned to Auckland, playing for the senior B side at the Eastern club. In 1975, he moved to Bombay to start a career as a farm adviser, and won representative selection for the first time at Counties. The following year, which was the first of the National Provincial Championship (the predecessor to today's Air New Zealand Cup), he was named captain at Counties.

All Blacks 
Dalton earned his first All Blacks cap during their 1977 tour of France.

By 1981, he had become the regular All Blacks hooker, and captained the side for the first time when Graham Mourie was unavailable for the series against . Dalton became the full-time captain upon Mourie's 1982 retirement, most notably leading the All Blacks against the Lions during their 1983 tour. He was chosen as captain for their aborted 1985 tour of South Africa, and went on to captain the unofficial Cavaliers tour of South Africa in 1986. He suffered a broken jaw In the second match of the tour and played no more rugby that season. Dalton was one of the most successful All Blacks captains in history, victorious in 15 of his 17 tests as captain.

He was named captain of the side that would go on to win the inaugural 1987 Rugby World Cup, but suffered an injury in a practice session that ruled him out of the tournament, leaving the honour of lifting the Webb Ellis Cup to David Kirk.

After rugby 
After his retirement from rugby immediately after the 1987 World Cup, he continued his career in agriculture for a time, but later became a corporate manager. He coached Counties from 1989 to 1991, and was president of the New Zealand Rugby Union from 1999 to 2000. He is now the CEO of the Auckland Rugby Football Union, having also been CEO of the Auckland Blues until those roles were separated in 2014, and operates a farm in the Bombay Hills south of Auckland.

References

External links

ESPN Profile

1951 births
Living people
New Zealand international rugby union players
Lincoln University (New Zealand) alumni
New Zealand rugby union coaches
New Zealand rugby union players
Rugby union players from Dunedin
Rugby union hookers
Counties Manukau rugby union players